Hindeloopen Frisian (natively , West Frisian: , also referred to as Hindeloopers in English and Dutch, is a West Frisian variety spoken in the port town of Hindeloopen and the village of Molkwerum on the west coast of Friesland. It has preserved much of the Old Frisian phonology and lexicon, and has been attested to since the 17th Century. Hindelooper is spoken by some 500 people in Hindeloopen, almost all of them elderly, with the number of speakers decreasing.

Recognition 
In 2006, work began on a sucsessor to the dictionary, which was published in 2019 under the name Graet Hylper Wordebook. Authors of the new edition included  and Sybrek Dyk. The newdictionary contains 1000 pages of words, grammar and synonyms and is considered the definitive version of the language.

In 2019,  Glottolog assigned the language the code "hind1273", under the name "Hindeloopen-Molkwerum Frisian". Language activist , responsible for the Glottolog entries of both Hinderloopers and Terschelling Frisian stated that "these 3 languages have a complete language system, it's not just a few words which are different from Frisian, the languages have developed separately from Frisian. Hylpers and Frisian are more different from each other than Afrikaans and Dutch" in an interview with Trouw regarding the dialect. 

The Hylper language is taught at the local elementary school.

Development
Due to its position on a peninsula, Hindeloopen was very isolated from the mainland until the 20th century and for centuries had more contact with the coastal cities in Holland on the other side of the South Sea. Because of this, Hindeloopen Frisian underwent greater influence from Hollandic speech than the other dialects of West Frisian. The location of Hindeloopen is, however, not a complete explanation for the dialect: until about 1800, Koudum had a dialect that was very similar to Hindeloopen.

Differences compared to Standard West Frisian
In Hindeloopen Frisian, the l in the trigraphs âld and âlt is pronounced, as in Standard West Frisian, and is subject to vowel lengthening. 
The digraph ae is still used instead of the modern aa.
The standard ú is written uu.
Non-standard letters used: ä, ö, è and ò.

The dialect’s vocabulary preserves many more words from Old Frisian that are no longer used elsewhere.
The differences in pronunciation and vocabulary between Hindeloopen Frisian and Standard West Frisian are so big that mutual intelligibility is difficult. However, Hindeloopen Frisian has gradually become more like standard West Frisian due to increasing contact with speakers of other dialects.

Example

References

West Frisian language
Súdwest-Fryslân
Languages attested from the 17th century